Ranjeet Singh may refer to:
Ranjeet Singh (Pakistani politician)
Ranjeet Singh (Indian politician)